is a Japanese former jurist, diplomat and law professor. He served as a judge on the International Court of Justice from 2003 until June 7, 2018, and was President of the Court from 2009 to 2012. He is the father of Empress Masako and the father-in-law of the incumbent Emperor of Japan, Naruhito.

Early life and family
Owada was born in Shibata, Niigata Prefecture, Japan,  the third of seven children.

Owada's father Takeo is descended from the Owada clan, whose head Shinroku—Masako's 4th-great-grandfather—was called to Murakami in 1787 to serve the Naito clan which the Tokugawa shōgun had installed as the city's rulers sixty-seven years earlier. After the fall of the shogunate, the Owadas participated in a salmon-fishing cooperative, the proceeds of which provided schooling for many local children, including Takeo.

Takeo became principal of a prefectural high school in modern-day Joetsu city and head of its board of education. Takeo and his wife would have seven children, all of whom survived infancy to graduate from university or teaching college. His five sons all graduated from the University of Tokyo—Akira, who would become assistant professor at the University of London and professor at Senshu University; Takashi, who would become a lawyer; Hisashi; Osamu, who would become head of the Japan National Tourist Organization; and Makoto, who would become an inspector at the Ministry of Transportation's Ports and Harbors Bureau. His two daughters Yasuko and Toshiko would marry highly, the former to managing director of Krosaki-Harima Tadashi Katada and the latter to one-time managing director of the Industrial Bank of Japan (IBJ) Kazuhide Kashiwabara.

Career

After earning a B.A. from the University of Tokyo in 1955, Owada passed the civil service examinations to join the Diplomatic and Consular Service, now known as the Foreign Service.

Educator

Owada received sponsorship from the Foreign Ministry to study at Trinity College, Cambridge in the United Kingdom where he earned a law degree in 1959 and later a doctorate of philosophy. Overall he served as a law professor for three decades at the University of Tokyo, Harvard Law School, New York University Law School, Columbia Law School, The Hague Academy of International Law, Waseda University, and the University of Cambridge. In between postings he took semesters as a visiting professor in international treaty law, his specialty, at Harvard and at Oxford. He also served as the Bright International Jurist-in-Residence at the University of Hawaii's William S. Richardson School of Law in 2010. He has received honorary degrees from Keiwa College, Banaras Hindu University, and Waseda University.

Diplomat

Owada's first foreign assignment was Moscow, serving from 1963 to 1969. Immediately following, from 1969 to 1971, was a post at the United Nations in New York, New York.

Returning to Japan, Owada was chosen to accompany Emperor Hirohito on his first postwar trip outside Japan to Europe. From 1976 to 1978, he served as Private Secretary to Takeo Fukuda, the Prime Minister of Japan.

From 1979 to 1981, while serving as visiting professor at Harvard Law School, Owada "remain[ed] on the Foreign Ministry payroll with the title of Minister at the Embassy in Washington, and would resume his career with another plum posting the following year." After this, however, the Owadas would move again to Moscow save for Masako, who would stay behind to enroll as a student at Harvard University.

In 1988, Owada was appointed Japanese ambassador to the Organisation for Economic Co-operation and Development (OECD) in Paris. He served for a year before returning to Japan, working first as Deputy Minister and from 1991 to 1993 as Vice-Minister of Foreign Affairs.

From 1994 to 1998, he served as Japanese ambassador to the United Nations, where he served twice as United Nations Security Council President.

From 1999 to 2000 Owada then served as senior adviser to the President of the World Bank. Owada was president of the Japan Institute of International Affairs and adviser to the Japanese Ministry of Foreign Affairs until 2003.

Post-Diplomat
Having been re-elected to the ICJ in 2011, Owada's term was set to expire on 5 February 2021 prior to his retirement in June, 2018. He received 170 out of 192 votes in the General Assembly on the first round, more than any other candidate, and 14 out of 15 votes in the Security Council on the first round. Owada had been nominated by the Japanese national group of the Permanent Court of Arbitration (as well as the national groups of 32 other countries).

He is currently a member of the Whitney R. Harris World Law Institute's International Council, and a member of the Crimes Against Humanity Initiative Advisory Council, a project of the Harris Institute at  Washington University School of Law in St. Louis to establish the world’s first treaty on the prevention and punishment of crimes against humanity.

Personal life

Wife and children
In 1962, at age 30, Hisashi married 25 year-old Yumiko Egashira, introduced to him by a mutual friend and later employer Takeo Fukuda.  A year later, their eldest daughter Masako was born at Toranomon Hospital in Tokyo, followed by twins Reiko and Setsuko in the summer of 1966 in Geneva, Switzerland.

In 1993, Hisashi's daughter Masako Owada, a diplomat in her own right, married Crown Prince Naruhito, the heir to the Japanese Chrysanthemum Throne. Following Emperor Akihito's 2019 abdication, she became empress consort.

Lectures
 Human Security and International Law in the Lecture Series of the United Nations Audiovisual Library of International Law
 Asia and International Law: A New Era Distinguished Speakers Panel in the Lecture Series of the United Nations Audiovisual Library of International Law
 The Encounter of Japan with the Community of Civilized Nations in the Lecture Series of the United Nations Audiovisual Library of International Law

Notable ICJ cases
 Sovereignty over Pedra Branca/Pulau Batu Puteh, Middle Rocks and South Ledge (Malaysia v. Singapore)
 Pulp Mills on the River Uruguay (Argentina v. Uruguay)
 Application of the Convention on the Prevention and Punishment of the Crime of Genocide (Bosnia and Herzegovina v. Serbia and Montenegro)
 Jurisdictional Immunities of the State (Germany v. Italy)
 Advisory opinion on Kosovo's declaration of independence

References

 International Court of Justice Biography of H.E. President Hisashi Owada
 Japanese Imperial Household Agency
 H.E. Judge Hisashi Owada (Japan) Elected the ICJ President and H.E. Judge Peter Tomka (Slovakia) Elected Vice-President in 2009-2012 and Statement of Japan Foreign Minister Nakasone on the Election of ICJ President Hisashi Owada of 6 February 2009 and Tokyo MFA and ASIL and Japanese Judge Elected World Court's New President and New President of ICJ Elected and Judge Owada of Japan Elected New President of the ICJ and World News and page 1: H.E. Judge Hisashi Owada Named ICJ President and Japanese Judge Elected President of World Court for First Time and Japanner Owada Is Voorzitter Internationaal Gerechtshof - ICJ, Belgian Nieuwsblad of 6 February 2009 and NRC Handelsblad
 Brandeis Institute for International Judges 2007 pages 21 and 34 and 5th Brandeis on 23-28 July 2007, Including H.E. Former ICJ President Stephen M. Schwebel and H.E. Judges Hisashi Owada and Peter Tomka
 2005 Keynote Speech of H.E. Judge Hisashi Owada and Distinguished Fellows Lecture of 9 November 2005 and NYU Distinguished Global Fellows
 10th IDI Commission on Authorization to Resort to Force Given by the United Nations and 12th IDI Commission on Judicial Control of UNSC Decisions of the Institute of International Law and IDI Members
 H.E. ICJ President Hisashi Owada's Lecture on The Encounter of Japan with the Community of Civilized Nations at newly launched in October 2008 UN Audiovisual Library of International Law and UN-Law
 H.E. ICJ President Hisashi Owada with UNSG Ban Ki-Moon of 23 March 2009 and UN Photographs
 Philip Jessup's 50th Anniversary Honorary Committee and 50th Jessup Video and 50th Jessup Programme and Prize for "Best Jessup Oralist" Launched in Honour of H.E. Former ICJ President Stephen M. Schwebel at the 103rd ASIL Annual Meeting on International Law as Law, Fairmont Hotel in Washington, D.C., 25–28 March 2009
 Statement of H.E. ICJ President Hisashi Owada to the 64th UNGA of 29 October 2009 and GA/10878 of 29 October 2009, pp.1-3 & 13-22 and President Owada's Statement to the 6th Committee, GA/L/3377 of 30 October 2009
 Solemn Tribute of H.E. ICJ President Hisashi Owada to the memory of Professor Shabtai Rosenne, in Nicaragua v. Colombia Territorial and Maritime Dispute (Costa Rica's Intervention) Oral Hearings, CR 2010/12, at p. 10 of 11 October 2010 and UN 6th Committee Pays Respect to the Israeli Jurist Shabtai Rosenne of 6 October 2010 and  Shabtai Rosenne Obituary: Eminent International Lawyer, Teacher and Israeli Diplomat by Malcolm Shaw of 12 October 2010 and In Memoriam Shabtai Rosenne (24 November 1917-21 September 2010) by Prof. B. Kwiatkowska, in 26 IJMCL 1-3 (2011 No.1) & NILOS Papers
 Who's Who in Public International Law 2007

1932 births
Living people
Japanese judges
Presidents of the International Court of Justice
Permanent Representatives of Japan to the United Nations
Ambassadors of Japan to the Organisation for Economic Co-operation and Development
World Bank people
Harvard Law School faculty
Columbia Law School faculty
New York University faculty
Academic staff of Waseda University
William S. Richardson School of Law faculty
The Hague Academy of International Law people
People from Niigata Prefecture
University of Tokyo alumni
Alumni of Trinity College, Cambridge
Grand Crosses with Star and Sash of the Order of Merit of the Federal Republic of Germany
Japanese judges of United Nations courts and tribunals
Members of the Institut de Droit International
Japanese legal scholars